Itacuruçá is a district of the municipality of Mangaratiba, in the Greater Rio de Janeiro, Brazil. It is a part of the Green Coast.

Populated places in Rio de Janeiro (state)